"What the Hell Did I Say" is a song co-written and recorded by country music artist Dierks Bentley. It was released in June 2017 as the fourth single from his 2016 album Black. This is the second collaboration by Bentley, Kear and Tompkins, following the highly successful No. 1 single "Drunk on a Plane". However, unlike "Drunk", this song underperformed and became the lowest charting single of Bentley's career.

Content
The protagonist's ex is calling to inform him she is coming to see him, after hearing something he said the previous evening when he was drunk at the bar and decided to call her. He is struggling to recall what exactly he said, for example promising to buy her a diamond ring and take her to Las Vegas to get married.

Music video
A promotional video directed by Wes Edwards premiered on April 29, 2016 as part of the album's pre-release video series. The official music video was released on July 9, 2017. Also directed by Edwards, the video is composed of footage from Bentley's 2017 tour.

Charts

Release history

References

2016 songs
2017 singles
Capitol Records Nashville singles
Dierks Bentley songs
Songs written by Chris Tompkins
Songs written by Dierks Bentley
Songs written by Josh Kear
Song recordings produced by Ross Copperman